Akhtar Hassan Khan Gorchani (born 1 August 1958) is a Pakistani diplomat, politician, and former intelligence official. He graduated from Government College, Lahore in 1976. He sat in the competitive exam for the Central Superior Services in November 1980. He was assigned to the Police Service of Pakistan.

Bureaucratic career 
During his tenure in the police, he received a Bachelor of Law degree and a Master of Arts degree in Political Science. He served in various capacities in the provinces of the Punjab and Sindh. As Assistant Superintendent of Police, he was posted at Tank, Layyah, Jhang, and Wazirabad. As Superintendent (SP) and Senior Superintendent (SSP), he served as SP-Punjab Constabulary, Additional SP Multan; SP Lodhran; SP Traffic (Highways), Multan; SSP Sukkur, Jacobabad, Hyderabad, Thatta, Gujranwala, Karachi West; Deputy Director, FIA, Rawalpindi and Faisalabad.

In 2003 he joined Pakistan's delegation to the United Nations peace mission in Kosovo. After returning to Pakistan, he held posts as Deputy Inspector General of Police, Larkana and Regional Police Officer Multan before becoming Police Chief in Karachi. In July 2012 he was named Director General of the Intelligence Bureau. Soon afterwards, he became Minister for Community Affairs at the Embassy of Pakistan in Washington D.C.

He is author of "The Sindh Police, brief history & developments" published by Oxford University Press in 2007.

Political career 
On 18 May 2022, both Gorchani and his son, Athar Hassan Khan Gorchani, who is a former member of the Provincial Assembly of the Punjab, joined the Pakistan People's Party (PPP).

On 28 January 2023, he became the PPP candidate for the NA-193 (Rajanpur-I) by-election.

References

Pakistani diplomats
Pakistani police officers
Living people
1956 births